Pachydactylus scherzi is a species of lizard in the family Gekkonidae. The species is native to Southern Africa.

Etymology
The specific name, scherzi, is in honor of German chemical engineer Ernst Rudolph Scherz (1906–1981).

Geographic range
P. scherzi is found in Angola and Namibia.

Habitat
The preferred natural habitat of P. scherzi is rocky outcrops in desert or savanna.

Description
Dorsally, P. scherzi is brown, with whitish crossbands that are edged with dark brown and often broken in the middle. Ventrally it is cream-colored.

Reproduction
P. scherzi is oviparous.

References

Further reading
Bauer AM, Branch WR (1995). "Geographic variation in western populations of the Pachydactylus punctatus complex (Reptilia Gekkonidae)". Tropical Zoology 8 (1): 69-84. (Pachydactylus scherzi, new status).
Gates BC (2004). "Field Observations of the Thick-toed Gecko Pachydactylus scherzi Mertens, 1954 Near Namibia's Skeleton Coast". Gekko 4 (1): 18-22.
Gates BC (2006). "Observations of the Thick-toed Gecko Pachydactylus scherzi Mertens, 1954 Near the Brandberg, Namibia". Gekko 5 (1): 2-4.
Herrmann H-W, Branch WR (2013). "Fifty years of herpetological research in the Namib Desert and Namibia with an updated and annotated species checklist". Journal of Arid Environments 93: 94-115.
Mertens R (1954). "Neue Eidechsen aus Südwest-Afrika ". Senckenbergiana 34: 175-183. (Pachydactylus punctatus scherzi, new subspecies). (in German).
Rösler H (2000). "Kommentierte Liste der rezent, subrezent und fossil bekannten Geckotaxa (Reptilia: Gekkonomorpha)". Gekkota 2: 28-153. (Pachydactylus scherzi, p. 99). (in German).

Pachydactylus
Geckos of Africa
Reptiles of Angola
Reptiles of Namibia
Reptiles described in 1954
Taxa named by Robert Mertens